For the mansion in Memphis, Tennessee, see Beverly Hall.

Beverly La-Forte Hall (July 7, 1946 – March 2, 2015) was a Jamaican-American education administrator. She worked as the superintendent of schools in Queens, New York; Newark, New Jersey; and Atlanta, Georgia.

Life and career
Hall was born Beverly La-Forte Clare in Montego Bay, Jamaica and graduated from Saint Andrew High School for Girls in Saint Andrew Parish. She moved to the United States for college and received her undergraduate degree from Brooklyn College in 1970. She then received a master's degree from the City University of New York. Hall received her Ed.D. from Fordham University in 1990.

Hall began her education career in several Brooklyn public schools. She taught English at Junior High School 265, then served as coordinator of Satellite West Junior High School, principal of P.S. 282, and principal of J.H.S. 113 (now Ronald Edmonds Learning Center). While working as a Queens district superintendent in 1994, Hall was given "control of the city's high schools, special education programs and all other centrally controlled instructional programs" by Chancellor Ramon C. Cortines.

Hall served as superintendent of the Newark Public Schools from 1995 to 1999, being appointed after the state of New Jersey took over the school system. She was appointed superintendent of the Atlanta Public Schools from 1999 until her resignation in 2010. In 2009, the American Association of School Administrators named Hall as National Superintendent of the Year, mentioning Atlanta's "significant gains in student achievement over the past 10 years."

Indictment
Hall was indicted on March 29, 2013, by a Fulton County grand jury in relation to her role in the Atlanta Public Schools cheating scandal.

She was charged with racketeering, making false statements, theft, influencing witnesses, and conspiracy. In the original report prior to the indictment, investigators accused Dr. Hall of creating "a culture of fear, intimidation and retaliation” that permitted "cheating — at all levels — to go unchecked for years.” Hall died before trial.

Death
On March 2, 2015, Beverly Hall died of breast cancer, aged 68.

References

External links

2015 deaths
1946 births
American academic administrators
Brooklyn College alumni
Deaths from breast cancer
Fordham University alumni
Graduate Center, CUNY alumni
Jamaican emigrants to the United States
People from Montego Bay
Women academic administrators